Assel is a village in the commune of Bous, in south-eastern Luxembourg.  , the village had a population of 157.

The bus journey time between Assel and Luxembourg is around 29 min and covers a distance of around 18 km.

References

External links
 

Remich (canton)
Villages in Luxembourg